Newton Cemetery is a cemetery in Newton, in Sussex County, New Jersey, United States.  Founded in 1860, the  cemetery is in current use and is owned and operated by the Newton Cemetery Company.

It is the "new" cemetery in town—opening after the Old Newton Burial Ground (founded 1762) was filled.

The Newton Cemetery Company was incorporated on 22 March 1860 by an act of the New Jersey state legislature. It named seven men as "corporators", including Michael B. Titman, Moses W. Northrup, attorney Daniel S. Anderson, Samuel Cassady, the Reverend Nathaniel Pettit (of Christ Church, Newton), Thomas N. McCarter, and Whitfield S. Johnson. By 1866, the corporators had raised funds—approximately $16,000—to purchase a  tract of land from the heirs of Aaron Peck and open for burials. According to James P. Snell, the first interment was for Joseph A. Linn, who was buried in August 1867. Five years later, in 1872, a local newspaper reported that "the number of interments is about 340--a large majority of which were re-interments from other places".

Burial options at Newton Cemetery include interment in the cemetery's Mausoleum Chapel, erected in 1991.

Notable burials

 Jacob L. Bunnell (1855-1932), newspaperman, owner of Blairstown Press, New Jersey Herald, Sussex Independent.
 Thomas G. Bunnell (1834-189?), editor and later owner of the New Jersey Herald
 George Sullivan Dodge (1838-1881) Chief Quartermaster of the Army of the James, Battle of Fort Fisher, Bvt. Brigadier General, American Civil War
 Benjamin Edsall, poet, orator, editor of the Sussex Register
 Bartholomew Gill (Mark C. McGarrity) (1943-2002), American crime fiction-mystery novelist, newspaper feature writer.
 John Kays (1739-1829), Revolutionary War military officer, aide to George Washington.
 Henry C. Kelsey, New Jersey Secretary of State, leader of the Kelsey Ring
 Warren K. Lewis (1882-1975), MIT professor, "father of modern chemical engineering."
 Lewis J. Martin (1844-1913), represented New Jersey's 6th congressional district in 1913.
 Henry W. Merriam (1828-1900), industrialist and philanthropist
 Robert Hamilton (1809-1878), represented New Jersey's 4th congressional district from 1873 to 1877.
 Andrew J. Rogers, Copperhead congressman during Civil War
 Francis J. Swayze, Justice of the New Jersey Supreme Court.

The Lewis children's "cave grave"
In 1909, three local children were lost in the underground limestone caverns underneath the town of Newton. An entrance to these caves (now sealed) was located in the woods near the cemetery. Currently, a marker bearing the names of these three children, James W., Margaret, and J. Howard Lewis, is mounted in the face of the rock-outcropping approximately fifty-yards into the woods on the cemetery property.  The magazine Weird NJ recounts that the daughter, Margaret found her way into the cave and got lost.  Her two brothers went in to find her and also got lost.

Gallery

References

External links
 Newton Cemetery Company
 Newton Cemetery Tombstone Inscriptions (Sussex County Historical Society, Nancy Pascal)
 Newton Cemetery at The Political Graveyard
 Newton Cemetery at Find A Grave

Cemeteries in Sussex County, New Jersey
Newton, New Jersey
1867 establishments in New Jersey